Desierto de Almería is a Spanish geographical indication for Vino de la Tierra wines located in the autonomous region of Andalusia. Vino de la Tierra is one step below the mainstream Denominación de Origen indication on the Spanish wine quality ladder.

The area covered by this geographical indication comprises the following municipalities: Alcudia de Monteagud, Benitagla, Benizalón, Castro de Filabres, Lubrín, Lucainena de las Torres, Olula de Castro, Senés, Sorbas, Tabernas, Tahal, Turrillas, Uleila del Campo and Velefique, in the province of Almería (Andalusia, Spain).

It acquired its Vino de la Tierra status in 2003.

Grape varieties
 Red: Garnacha tinta, Monastrell, Syrah, Cabernet Sauvignon and Merlot
 White: Chardonnay, Moscatel, Macabeo and Sauvignon blanc

References

Spanish wine
Wine regions of Spain
Wine-related lists
Appellations